Baoning is an atonal pinyin romanization of various Chinese words and names, and may refer to:

 Baoning Prefecture, a former administrative division of Sichuan
 Baoning, Sichuan, the seat of the former prefecture, now known as Langzhong
 Boryeong, a city in South Chungcheong Province, South Korea, known as "Baoning" in Chinese